Royal Observatory may refer to:

 Royal Observatory, Greenwich in England (formerly the Royal Greenwich Observatory)
 Paris Observatory in France (formerly the Royal Observatory, France)
 Royal Observatory of Belgium
 Royal Observatory, Edinburgh in Scotland
 Hong Kong Observatory, (formerly the Royal Observatory, Hong Kong until 1997)
 Royal Observatory, Cape of Good Hope in South Africa